Alabama Hill is a suburb of Charters Towers in the Charters Towers Region, Queensland, Australia.

History 

Heritage listings 

Alabama Hill has a number of heritage-listed sites, including:
 Charters Towers mine shafts

Education
There are no schools in Alabama Hill. The nearest primary school is Charters Towers Central State School in neighbouring Charters Towers City to the east. The nearest secondary school is Charters Towers State High School in Charters Towers City.

References

Suburbs of Charters Towers